One shot may refer to:

Film and television
 One-shot film, a feature film shot in one long take with no edits, or manufactured to look like so
 One Shot (2005 film), a Sri Lankan action film directed by Ranjan Ramanayake
 One Shot (2021 film), a British action thriller film directed by James Nunn
 Jack Reacher (film) (previously titled One Shot), a 2012 American thriller film adapted from Lee Child's novel (see below)
 Marvel One-Shots, short films in the Marvel Cinematic Universe
 One Shot, a 2016–2017 program broadcast by BET

Literature
 One-shot (comics), a single-issue comic book which is not published as a part of a series or mini-series
 One Shot (novel), a 2005 Jack Reacher novel by Lee Child

Music
 One Shot (EP) or the title song, by B.A.P.

Songs
 "One Shot" (The Brotherhood song), 1996
 "One Shot" (JLS song), 2010
 "One Shot" (Mabel song), 2018
 "One Shot" (Tin Machine song), 1991
 "One Shot" (YoungBoy Never Broke Again song), 2020
 "One Shot", by Danity Kane from Danity Kane
 "One Shot", by Hunter Hayes from Wild Blue (Part I)
 "One Shot", by Mario Vazquez from Mario Vazquez
 "One Shot", by the Newsboys from Born Again
 "One Shot", by Rob Thomas from The Great Unknown
 "One Shot", by Robin Thicke
 "One Shot", by The Saturdays from Wordshaker

Technology and computing
 OneShot, a 2016 metafictional adventure video game
 One-shot learning in computer vision
 Monostable or one shot, a type of electronic circuit
 Programmable interval timer or one-shot timer

See also
Standalone (disambiguation)